Dália da Cunha-Sammer (26 December 1928 – 19 October 2022) was a Portuguese gymnast. She competed at the 1952 Summer Olympics and the 1960 Summer Olympics.

Cunha-Sammer died on 19 October 2022, at the age of 93.

References

External links

1928 births
2022 deaths
Portuguese female artistic gymnasts
Olympic gymnasts of Portugal
Gymnasts at the 1952 Summer Olympics
Gymnasts at the 1960 Summer Olympics
Sportspeople from Lisbon
20th-century Portuguese women